Harrison's Cave is a tourist attraction in the country of Barbados, first mentioned in 1795. Tourists can access the subterranean environment on a tramway.

History
The caves were first mentioned in historical documents in 1795, and were rediscovered in the early 1970s by Jack Peeples.

They were developed by the government as part of a tram tour, and opened to the public in 1981.

Description

Harrison's Cave is in the central uplands of Barbados. The three characteristics of the central uplands are gullies, sinkholes and caverns. It is also an entrance for another place of interest: Welchman Hall Gully which is closed.

The caves are naturally formed by water erosion through the limestone rock. The calcium-rich water that runs through the caves have formed the unusual stalactites and stalagmites formations.

Travel through the caves is by tram, at certain points during the tour visitors are allowed to alight from the tram and get close up to the formations. After the great Hall the tram stops at "The Village". At The Village, some of the formations have joined to form columns after thousands of years. Other areas the tram stops along the tour is "The Chapel," "The Rotunda," and "The Altar." Visitors travel through the Boyce Tunnel via tram to all depths of the cave.

References

External links
 Review of Harrisons Cave
 Official website
 Review of Harrison's Cave

Saint Thomas, Barbados
Natural history of Barbados
Show caves
Limestone caves
Caves of Barbados
Tourist attractions in Barbados
Caves of the Caribbean